"A Fine Romance" is a popular song composed by Jerome Kern with lyrics by Dorothy Fields, published in 1936.

The song was written for the musical film, Swing Time, where it was co-introduced by Fred Astaire and Ginger Rogers. Astaire recorded a solo version of the song on July 28, 1936 for Brunswick records (catalog 7716) and it topped the charts of the day for five weeks. Billie Holiday recorded the song for Vocalion Records on September 29, 1936 and this too reached the charts of the day as did versions by Henry King and Guy Lombardo.

In Hollywood, Louis Armstrong and Ella Fitzgerald recorded their version of the song in the summer of 1957.  In 1963, Fitzgerald included a solo rendition on her Verve Records album, Ella Fitzgerald Sings the Jerome Kern Songbook, produced by Norman Granz.

In a version sung by Judi Dench it also became the theme song of A Fine Romance, a British television series starring Dench and her husband Michael Williams.

In the film Till the Clouds Roll By (1946), the song is performed by Virginia O'Brien.

A recording by Lena Horne features in the film The Adventures of Priscilla, Queen of the Desert (1994). The song also features in the stage musical Priscilla Queen of the Desert – the Musical.

Notable recordings
 Bing Crosby and Dixie Lee Crosby with Victor Young & His Orchestra (recorded August 19, 1936) 
 Henry King and his Orchestra with vocals by Joe Sudy (1936)
 Louis Armstrong and Ella Fitzgerald – Ella and Louis Again (1957)
 Fred Astaire – The Astaire Story (1953)
 Count Basie and Joe Williams – The Greatest!! Count Basie Plays, Joe Williams Sings Standards (1956)
 Ann Hampton Callaway – To Ella with Love (1996)
 Sammy Davis, Jr. and Carmen McRae – Boy Meets Girl (1957)
 Ella Fitzgerald – Ella Fitzgerald Sings the Jerome Kern Songbook (1963)
 Billie Holiday – 1936 single, The Quintessential Billie Holiday: Vol. II (1987)
 Lena Horne – Lena in Hollywood (1966)
 Stacey Kent – Let Yourself Go: Celebrating Fred Astaire (2000)
 Steve Lawrence and Eydie Gormé – Cozy (1961)
 Susannah McCorkle – How Do You Keep the Music Playing (1985)
 Sylvia McNair – Sure Thing: The Jerome Kern Songbook (1994)
 Marian McPartland – Lullaby of Birdland (1952)
 Johnny Mercer and Martha Tilton – 1946 single, The Song Is You: Capitol Sings Jerome Kern (1992)
 Marilyn Monroe – Diamonds Are a Girl's Best Friend (2006)
 Frank Sinatra – Ring-a-Ding-Ding! (1961)
 Mel Tormé – Mel Tormé Sings Fred Astaire (1956)
 Margaret Whiting – Margaret Whiting Sings the Jerome Kern Songbook (1960)
 Jerry Hadley and Frederica Von Stade - Puttin' on the Ritz with Erich Kunzel / Cincinnati Pops (1995)
 Kiri Te Kanawa - Kiri Sings Kern (1993)

References

Songs with music by Jerome Kern
Songs with lyrics by Dorothy Fields
Fred Astaire songs
1936 songs